USS Nicholson (TB-29) was a  in the United States Navy.

Built in Elizabeth, New Jersey 

The first ship to be so named by the Navy, Nicholson (TB–29) was laid down 6 December 1898 by Lewis Nixon's Crescent Shipyard, Elizabethport, New Jersey; launched 23 September 1901; sponsored by Mrs. Oliver Hazard Perry Belmont; and commissioned at New York City 10 January 1905.

Service with the U.S. Navy 

Nicholson served with the Atlantic Fleet until struck from the Navy List 3 March 1909.

Inactivation
Nicholson was disposed of by being used as a target.

References

 
  Information about Lewis Nixon and naval architect Arthur Leopold Busch at this Crescent Shipyard site.
 NavSource Naval History Photographic History of the United States Navytographic History of the United States Navy - USS NICHOLSON (Torpedo Boat # 29, TB-29)

 

Torpedo boats of the United States Navy
Ships built in Elizabeth, New Jersey
1901 ships
Shipwrecks
Ships sunk as targets
Maritime incidents in 1909